Maria Lundqvist-Brömster (born 1956) is a Swedish Liberal People's Party politician. She has been a member of the Riksdag since 2006.

External links
Maria Lundqvist-Brömster at the Riksdag website

Members of the Riksdag from the Liberals (Sweden)
Living people
1956 births
Women members of the Riksdag
21st-century Swedish women politicians
Date of birth missing (living people)